Bryan Solhaug Fiabema (born 16 February 2003) is a Norwegian footballer who plays as a forward for Chelsea.

Club career
Fiabema joined Chelsea from Tromsø in January 2020 after a successful trial. In March 2022, Fiabema joined Norwegian top-flight side Rosenborg on loan.

Fiabema was recalled early from his loan to Rosenborg in August 2022.

On 1 September 2022, Fiabema joined League One side Forest Green Rovers on a season-long loan.

International career
Fiabema has represented Norway at all levels from Under-15 to Under-19.

Career statistics

References

2003 births
Living people
Norwegian people of Nigerian descent
Sportspeople from Tromsø
Norwegian footballers
Norway youth international footballers
Association football forwards
Eliteserien players
Norwegian Third Division players
English Football League players
Tromsø IL players
Chelsea F.C. players
Rosenborg BK players
Forest Green Rovers F.C. players
Norwegian expatriate footballers
Expatriate footballers in England
Norwegian expatriate sportspeople in England